The West Sussex Invitation Cricket League is a cricket competition in West Sussex, England. It was created by the merger of the West Sussex Cricket League and the Sussex Invitation Cricket League. It is one of two feeder leagues to the Sussex Cricket League, the other being the East Sussex Cricket League.

Organization
The League is divided into 9 divisions of 9 teams and 1 division of 14 teams. The large size of the bottom division is due to the winding up of division 11 for the 2013 season. The League also hosts a Sunday Twenty20 competition which runs for much of the season

Divisions

2014

References

Cricket in West Sussex
Cricket leagues